Isaiah Foskey (born October 30, 2000) is an American football defensive end for the Notre Dame Fighting Irish.

High school career
Foskey was born on October 30, 2000, in Antioch, California. He later attended the De La Salle High School in Concord, California, where he played defensive end and tight end on their football team. He played in the 2019 All-American Bowl. Foskey committed to the University of Notre Dame to play college football.

College career
Foskey played in four games his first year at Notre Dame in 2019 and had five tackles and a blocked punt. As a sophomore in 2020, he had 20 tackles and 4.5 sacks. Foskey returned in 2021 as a starter.

References

External links
Notre Dame Fighting Irish bio

2000 births
Living people
All-American college football players
American football defensive ends
De La Salle High School (Concord, California) alumni
Notre Dame Fighting Irish football players
People from Antioch, California
Players of American football from California
Sportspeople from the San Francisco Bay Area